Dichomeris sparsellus is a moth in the family Gelechiidae. It was described by Hugo Theodor Christoph in 1882. It is found in south-eastern Siberia, China (Heilongjiang), Korea and Japan.

The length of the forewings is 10–11 mm.

The larvae feed on Pterocarya rhoifolia, Juglans ailanthifolia, Juglans mandschurica and Juglans regia.

References

Moths described in 1882
sparsellus